Babbitt is a 1934 film adaptation of the novel of the same name by Sinclair Lewis directed by William Keighley and starring Aline MacMahon, Guy Kibbee and Claire Dodd. The screenplay is about a staid small-town businessman who gets ensnared in shady dealings.

Plot summary

Cast
 Aline MacMahon as Myra Babbitt
 Guy Kibbee as George F. Babbitt
 Claire Dodd as Tanis Judique
 Maxine Doyle as Verona Babbitt
 Glen Boles as Ted Babbitt
 Minor Watson as Paul F. Reisling
 Minna Gombell as Zilla Reisling
 Alan Hale as Charlie McKelvey
 Berton Churchill as Judge Virgil Thompson
 Russell Hicks as Commissioner Lyle Gurnee
 Nan Grey as Eunice Littlefield (as Nan Gray)
 Walter Walker as Luke Ethorne
 Arthur Aylesworth as Zeke
 Addison Richards as District Attorney
 Harry Tyler as Martin Gunch
 Arthur Hoyt as Willis Ivans
 Mary Treen as Miss McGoun
 Hattie McDaniel as Rosalie (uncredited)

References

Further reading
 Tibbetts, John C., and James M. Welsh, eds. The Encyclopedia of Novels Into Film (2nd ed. 2005) pp 21–22; includes 1924 film.

External links
 
 
 
 

American black-and-white films
Films based on American novels
Films based on works by Sinclair Lewis
Films directed by William Keighley
First National Pictures films
1934 drama films
1934 films
American drama films
Films produced by Samuel Bischoff
Warner Bros. films
1930s English-language films
1930s American films
English-language drama films